NGC 4450 is a  spiral galaxy in the constellation Coma Berenices.

Characteristics
NGC 4450 is a member of the Virgo Cluster that, like Messier 90, shows smooth, nearly featureless spiral arms, with few star formation regions and little neutral hydrogen compared to other similar spiral galaxies, something that justifies its classification as an anemic galaxy.

Measurements with the help of the Hubble Space Telescope show the center of this galaxy has a supermassive black hole.

References

External links
 

Unbarred spiral galaxies
Coma Berenices
4450
07594
41024
Virgo Cluster